The British Academy Television Award for Best News Coverage is one of the major categories of the British Academy Television Awards (BAFTAs), the primary awards ceremony of the British television industry. According to the BAFTA website, the category is for "an individual news programme"

The category has been through some name changes and has been merged a couple of times with other categories like Best Sport and Live Event and Best Current Affairs:
 In 1961 and 1962 an individual award named Best Current Events was presented, later in 1970 a category called Best Factual Current Affair was awarded.
 From 1978 to 1985 and also in 1992 it was presented as Best Actuality Coverage.
 From 1986 to 1991 it was presented as Best News or Outside Broadcast Coverage.
 From 1993 to 1994 and then from 1998 to 2001 it was presented as Best News and Current Affairs Journalism.
 From 1995 to 1997 and then since 2002 it has been presented as Best News Coverage.

Winners and nominees

1960s

1970s
Best Factual Current Affair

Best Actuality Coverage

1980s
Best Actuality Coverage

Best News or Outside Broadcast Coverage

1990s
Best News or Outside Broadcast Coverage

Best Actuality Coverage

Best News and Current Affairs Journalism

Best News Coverage

Best News and Current Affairs Journalism

2000s
Best News and Current Affairs Journalism

Best News Coverage

2010s

2020s

Note: The series that don't have recipients on the tables had Production team credited as recipients for the award or nomination.

References

External links
List of winners at the British Academy of Film and Television Arts

News Coverage